Robert James Barnes (25 March 1911 – 12 March 1987) was an Irish cricketer and Rugby Union player.

He made his debut for Ireland against the MCC in August 1928 and went on to represent his country on 14 occasions, his last coming in July 1949 against Yorkshire. Eight of those games had first-class status.

He played just once for the Ireland national rugby union team, against Wales in the 1933 Home Nations Championship, scoring one try.

See also
 List of Irish cricket and rugby union players

References
Rugby Union statistics from scrum.com
CricketEurope Stats zone profile

1911 births
1987 deaths
Irish cricketers
Irish rugby union players
Ireland international rugby union players
People from Armagh (city)
Cricketers from Northern Ireland
Rugby union players from County Armagh